Mannosyl-oligosaccharide 1,2-alpha-mannosidase IA is an enzyme that in humans is encoded by the MAN1A1 gene.

This gene encodes a class I mammalian Golgi 1,2-mannosidase which is a type II transmembrane protein. This protein catalyzes the removal of 3 distinct mannose residues from peptide-bound Man(9)-GlcNAc(2) oligosaccharides and belongs to family 47 of glycosyl hydrolases.

References

Further reading